Remote Luxury is the third EP by the Australian psychedelic rock band The Church, the first of two released in 1984. With the exception of the untypical, synth-heavy "Maybe These Boys", this is one of the more subdued works in the band's catalogue, carrying on the mix of dreamy guitar and keyboards from the previous year's Seance album, but this time in a lighter, more acoustic setting. Without any standout singles, it made little commercial impact, but showcased guitarist Marty Willson-Piper's lead vocals for the first time since 1982's The Blurred Crusade.

The material was collected for international release on the Remote Luxury compilation album later in 1984, along with the follow-up EP Persia.

In 2001, EMI Australia released the compilation album Sing-Songs//Remote Luxury//Persia, which contained remastered versions of all the tracks from the EP in their original running order.

Track listing
 "Maybe These Boys..." (Kilbey)
 "10,000 Miles" (Kilbey/Willson-Piper)
 "Into My Hands" (Kilbey)
 "A Month of Sundays" (Kilbey)
 "Remote Luxury" (Kilbey)

Personnel
Steve Kilbey: lead vocals, bass guitar, keyboards
Peter Koppes: guitars, vocals
Marty Willson-Piper: guitars, vocals, lead vocal on "10,000 Miles"
Richard Ploog: drums, percussion
with
David Moor: piano, additional strings and the lemon

1984 EPs
The Church (band) albums